Cilandiras Bridge is an ancient bridge in Turkey.

It is over Banaz Creek which is a tributary of Büyük Menderes River.

According to Uşak municipality, the one arch bridge was constructed during the Phrygian era of Anatolia. Both sides of the bridge superimpose on rock. During a maintenance, a cement portion had been added to the original structure. Currently there is a small hydroelectric plant next to the bridge. The area around the bridge and the small waterfall of the plant is a popular picnic site.

References

Arch bridges in Turkey
Buildings and structures in Uşak Province
Karahallı District
Tourist attractions in Uşak Province
Pedestrian bridges in Turkey
Stone bridges in Turkey
Bridges completed in the 2nd millennium BC